The Egegik River (pronounced locally, I-ga-gik; Central Alaskan Yup'ik, Igyagiiq; translation, "swift") is a waterway in the U.S. state of Alaska. A biological survey was conducted at the base of the Alaska Peninsula in 1902 by Wilfred Hudson Osgood, which included the Egegik River.

Etymology
The river has been known by other names and spellings: Ougagouk (1828); Ugaguk (obsolete except on Government maps) or Igagik (Russian variations); also variously Agouyak, lgiagik. Egegak. Ugiagik.

Geography
The river is located on the Alaska Peninsula. Its watershed originates in the Aleutian Range before it flows westward from Becharof Lake into Bristol Bay via Egegik Bay, an arm of Kvichak Bay. Egegik rapids are reported at the outlet of Becharof Lake. The town of Egegik is situated at the mouth of the river. White bluff is situated on the river's north shore, just inside Cape Chichagof at Bristol Bay. The  major tributaries are Kejulik River, Shosky Creek, and King Salmon River. The King Salmon River, which drains the area between Becharof and Naknek lakes, is the principal tributary to the Egegik from the north. Becharof National Wildlife Refuge is nearby.

Its tidewater extends  up river and the river is navigable to within  of the lake, where there is a succession of rapids. At low water, a large part of the river bed is exposed with shoals, banks, and narrow, winding channels. At the mouth, shoal water extends for several miles offshore.

Fauna
Spawning of pink salmon most commonly occurs in the river in the month of August. The coho salmon spawning and rearing habitat is situated along the main stem of the river. The main stream of the river supports chum salmon. Arctic Char migrate down the river in late May. Lake Trout are found near at the lake's outlet to Egegik River.

Economy
In 1899, the Alaska Packers Association, under the name of the Egegak Packing Company, began construction of a cannery on the left bank opposite and a little above the salting station; it was finished in 1900. In 1903, the North Alaska Salmon Company built and operated a cannery on the opposite shore from the Alaska Packers Association; it changed its name after several years to that of its new owners, Libby, McNeill & Libby. Gill nets only were employed, and the catch included king salmon (Chinook), dog salmon (chum salmon, canned under a pink salmon label), and coho salmon.

In the mid 1980s, there was one shore based processor/buyer at Egegik, with eight others working by other rivers in the locale. The Egegik District maintained 22 floating stations and had 492 drift net permit holders. Three-quarters of all personal use salmon came from the commercially caught fish.

See also
List of rivers of Alaska

References

Rivers of Lake and Peninsula Borough, Alaska
Rivers of Alaska